Son is the fourth studio album by Argentine singer-songwriter Juana Molina. It was released on 23 May 2006 by Domino Recording Company. It has received critical acclaim.

Title
Son is named after the various meanings of the word in Spanish. They include: "pleasant sound", "they are", a Cuban music genre, and the unit of sound sone.

Track listing

References

2006 albums
Domino Recording Company albums
Juana Molina albums